Teslim Babatunde Fatusi (born 17 September 1977) is an olympic gold medalist and Nigerian international footballer who played as a winger for Miami Dade FC.

Club career
Born in Surulere, Lagos State, Fatusi began playing youth football with Honey Babes and Ibukun Oluwa. He joined the youth team of Stationery Stores F.C. in 1991, and signed for the senior side in 1992. He moved to Côte d'Ivoire to play for ASEC Mimosas, before embarking on a career in Europe with Swiss Super League side Servette FC.

Fatusi has had a nomadic career, playing in at least nine countries. He last played in the Vietnamese second division league.

International career
Fatusi was part of Nigeria's gold medal-winning team at the 1996 Olympics.

Fatusi made several appearances for the senior Nigeria national football team. He scored on his debut, from a late penalty in a friendly against the Czech Republic in 1996.

References

External links

 Profile at Nigerian Players.com

1977 births
Living people
Sportspeople from Lagos
Nigerian footballers
Nigeria international footballers
Olympic footballers of Nigeria
Olympic gold medalists for Nigeria
Footballers at the 1996 Summer Olympics
Nemzeti Bajnokság I players
ASEC Mimosas players
Servette FC players
Yoruba sportspeople
Ferencvárosi TC footballers
Polonia Warsaw players
Association football wingers
Pécsi MFC players
1. FC Magdeburg players
Miami Dade FC players
Expatriate footballers in Poland
Nigerian expatriates in Poland
Expatriate footballers in Vietnam
Expatriate footballers in Hungary
Olympic medalists in football
Medalists at the 1996 Summer Olympics